Carbonic anhydrase 7 (CA7) is an enzyme that in humans is encoded by the CA7 gene.

Function 

Carbonic anhydrases are a large family of zinc metalloenzymes that catalyze the reversible hydration of carbon dioxide. They participate in a variety of biological processes, including respiration, calcification, acid-base balance, bone resorption, and the formation of aqueous humor, cerebrospinal fluid, saliva, and gastric acid. They show extensive diversity in tissue distribution and in their subcellular localization. The cytosolic protein encoded by this gene is predominantly expressed in the salivary glands. Alternative splicing in the coding region results in multiple transcript variants encoding different isoforms.

References

Further reading

External links 
 PDBe-KB provides an overview of all the structure information available in the PDB for Human Carbonic anhydrase 7